Nancy A. Thornberry is the founding CEO and current Chair, R&D at Kallyope Inc. in New York City. She previously worked with Merck Research Laboratories (MRL), joining the company in 1979 as a biochemist and retiring from the position of Senior Vice President and Franchise Head, Diabetes and Endocrinology in 2013.

In 1992, Thornberry identified the first caspase, Caspase-1/Interleukin-1 converting enzyme (ICE). 
In 1999, Thornberry initiated Merck's research into dipeptidyl peptidase-4, leading to the development of FDA-approved treatments for Type 2 diabetes. 
She has received a number of awards, including the 2011 PhRMA Discoverer’s Award.

Education
Thornberry grew up in South Bend, Indiana.  As of 1979, she earned a B.Sc. in Natural Science from Muhlenberg College in  Allentown, Pennsylvania.

Career
Thornberry joined Merck Research Laboratories (MRL) in Rahway, New Jersey as a biochemist in 1979. At her retirement from Merck in 2013 Thornberry held the position of Senior Vice President and Franchise Head, Diabetes and Endocrinology.

While an independent consultant to the biotechnology and pharmaceutical industries, Thornberry joined the boards of directors of Intarcia Therapeutics and Abide Therapeutics Both companies are involved in drug discovery targeting diabetes.
As of November 1, 2015, Thornberry became CEO of Kallyope Inc. in New York City.

Research
Thornberry's research areas include obesity,  diabetes, osteoporosis, fertility and contraception. Her work has led to the development of drug candidates including FDA-approved treatments for Type 2 diabetes.

Thornberry was involved in early enzymology research on Lisinopril, an angiotensin converting enzyme (ACE) inhibitor used for the treatment of hypertension.
Thornberry also helped to identify Niemann-Pick C1-Like 1 (NPC1L1) as the target of ezetimibe, an inhibitor of cholesterol absorption.

In 1992, her work on proteases led to the identification of the first caspase, caspase-1/Interleukin-1 converting enzyme (ICE).  She determined that ICE was the cysteine protease responsible for IL-1β processing in monocytes.
Thornberry also developed a novel method for analyzing protease specificities in combinatorial libraries of positional  scanning  substrates. Her work has led to the broader study of proteases in apoptosis.

Beginning in 1999, Thornberry led the biological team for the development of Januvia™ (generic: sitagliptin), a once-a-day oral medication that inhibits the dipeptidyl peptidase-4 (DPP-4) enzyme and improves glucose tolerance to treat Type 2 diabetes. Ann E. Weber led the corresponding chemistry team for the project. The drug was approved by the FDA in October 2006. Janumet™, a drug combining sitagliptin and metformin was also approved, in April 2007. In 2007, the research team at Merck received the Prix Galien USA award for their work on Januvia™.
The Januvia™ project was the first project at Merck to be co-led solely by women and the first project co-led solely by women to win the Discoverers Award.

At Kallyope Inc., drug discovery focuses on the study of the brain and the gut, examining connections between neuroscience and neural circuits and the gut and internal organs, to better understand and improve health and nutrition.

Thornberry also serves on the Boards of Directors of Intarcia Therapeutics, which is developing diabetes medicine, and of Abide Therapeutics, which is exploring the serine hydrolase family (including DPP-4) as drug targets.

Awards
 2013, Women in STEM honoree, Liberty Science Center (LSC)
 2011, Discoverer’s Award, Pharmaceutical Research and Manufacturers of America (PhRMA), with Ann E. Weber, for work which "has been of special benefit to humankind".
 2011, Thomas Alva Edison Patent Award, Research and Development Council of New Jersey
 2010, Heroes of Chemistry Award (ACS) with Ann E. Weber and Joseph Armstrong
 2008, Alumni Lifetime Achievement Award, Muhlenberg College
 2007, Prix Galien USA award to the Merck research team for Januvia™
 2007, Merck Directors Award for work on Januvia™
 Merck Presidential Fellowship

References

Living people
Muhlenberg College alumni
21st-century American chemists
American women chemists
American women chief executives
Year of birth missing (living people)
21st-century American women scientists